Lovinsky Pierre-Antoine is a Haitian human rights and political activist and former head of the Fondasyon Trant Septanm (FTS) (September 30 Foundation), an advocacy group founded to assist victims of the 1991 coup that removed Haiti's first elected president, Jean-Bertrand Aristide, from office.

Background
The FTS foundation worked to win the release of hundreds of political prisoners, including some detained during the 2004-06 "interim government". Lovinsky had announced his intention to run for the office of Senator as a candidate of the Fanmi Lavalas party. He was working as an adviser to their delegation in Haiti.

Disappearance
On August 12, 2007, he was abducted after a meeting in Delmas with American and Canadian human rights investigators. Because his whereabouts were known, some believed that someone associated with Lovinsky betrayed him. Two days later, on August 14, 2007, his family was contacted and a ransom of $300,000 USD was demanded, but there was no further contact from his abductors. His disappearance was taken up by Amnesty International.

See also

 List of kidnappings
 List of people who disappeared

References

2000s missing person cases
Fanmi Lavalas politicians
Haitian human rights activists
Kidnapped people
Missing people
Missing person cases in Haiti
Year of birth missing